Mikel Álvaro Salazar (born 20 December 1982) is a Spanish professional footballer who plays as a right winger for Club Portugalete.

Club career
Álvaro was born in Amurrio, Álava. After spending most of his career in Segunda División B or lower, mainly with hometown's Amurrio Club, he arrived at already 27 at CD Numancia of the Segunda División. His first game in the competition occurred on 29 August 2009, as he played one minute in a 2–1 away win against RC Celta de Vigo. Already as a starter, he scored his first goal as a professional, in a 1–0 home victory over Real Unión.

Álvaro terminated his contract with the Soria club in early August 2011, going on to spend the following two seasons in Georgia with FC Dinamo Tbilisi, where he shared teams with several compatriots. In the summer of 2013, he joined Azerbaijan Premier League side Inter Baku PIK on a two-year deal.

Álvaro left Auckland City FC in January 2016, and rejoined Dinamo Tbilisi later in the month. He returned to both his homeland and his native region on 16 January 2017, signing for third-tier SD Amorebieta.

Club statistics

Honours
Dinamo Tbilisi
Georgian Premier League: 2012–13, 2015–16
Georgian Cup: 2012–13, 2015–16

References

External links

1982 births
Living people
Sportspeople from Álava
Spanish footballers
Footballers from the Basque Country (autonomous community)
Association football wingers
Segunda División players
Segunda División B players
Tercera División players
Tercera Federación players
CD Aurrerá de Vitoria footballers
SD Indautxu footballers
Amurrio Club footballers
Barakaldo CF footballers
CD Dénia footballers
UE Lleida players
CD Numancia players
SD Amorebieta footballers
Club Portugalete players
Erovnuli Liga players
FC Dinamo Tbilisi players
Azerbaijan Premier League players
Shamakhi FK players
New Zealand Football Championship players
Auckland City FC players
Spanish expatriate footballers
Expatriate footballers in Georgia (country)
Expatriate footballers in Azerbaijan
Expatriate association footballers in New Zealand
Spanish expatriate sportspeople in Georgia (country)
Spanish expatriate sportspeople in Azerbaijan
Spanish expatriate sportspeople in New Zealand